The Shiralee is the debut full-length novel by D'Arcy Niland published in 1955. It was adapted into a movie in 1957 and a mini series in 1987.

Plot
The swagman Macauley takes his young daughter Buster on the road with him.

Reception
The Argus called it a "great Australian novel".

The New York Times called it a "fine story" which Niland "told well... Mr Niland's approach is honest as it is refreshing... one wants to hear more from him".

Adaptations
Film rights were sold in 1955 for a reported £10,000.

In 1957 a British film was made by Ealing Studios, directed by Leslie Norman.

A second adaptation was made in 1987. It was an Australian TV film directed by George Ogilvie, starring Bryan Brown and Noni Hazelhurst.

Notes
 Dedication: This book is for my Mother / Barbara Lucy Niland
 Epigraph: Consists of an extract from a poem 'The Ballad of the Shiralee', by Ruth Park.

References

External links
The Shiralee at Darcyniland.com

Australian novels adapted into films
1955 Australian novels
1955 debut novels
Angus & Robertson books